Qasr Mushatta ("Winter Palace") is the ruin of an Umayyad winter palace, probably commissioned by Caliph Al-Walid II during his brief reign (743-744). The ruins are located approximately 30 km south of Amman, Jordan, north of Queen Alia International Airport, and are part of a string of castles, palaces and caravanserais known collectively in Jordan and the wider Southern Levant region as the Desert Castles. Though much of the ruins can still be found in situ, the most striking feature of the palace, its facade, has been removed and is on display at the Pergamon Museum in Berlin. The complex was never completed.

Architecture
The ruins of Qasr Mushatta consist of a square enclosure, surrounded by an outer wall comprising 25 towers. Its internal space is divided into three equal longitudinal strips, of which just the central one was completed to some degree. This central strip contains three major elements: on its southern side is what K. A. C. Creswell called the "Gateway Block", followed by the large central courtyard, which leads northwards to the reception hall wing. The Gateway Block presents only the foundations of several rooms arranged symmetrically around a small courtyard. Among the rooms there is a small mosque, recognisable by the concave mihrab on its southern wall, facing Mecca.

The large central courtyard had a rectangular pond at its centre. The reception hall wing, called by Creswell the "Main Building", placed at the centre of the northern part of the enclosure, was the only fully built section of the palace. It consists of a basilica-shaped hall (a vaulted hallway with three aisles separated by columns), leading up to the throne room. The throne room is triconch-shaped (a "triple iwan"), with the central conch once containing the throne, and was covered by a brick dome. The side rooms of the reception hall wing were combined into four residential suites, called in Arabic buyut, the plural of bayt,

 barrel-vaulted and ventilated through concealed air ducts.

The most famous element of Mshatta is the carved frieze which decorated a section of the southern facade, on both sides of the entrance gate. It is worth noticing that not the entire facade was adorned by the frieze, but only its central third, which corresponded to the very strip of the complex apparently reserved to the caliph, and the only one close to completion. The frieze is of high importance to scholars due to its original combination of Classical and Sasanian decorative elements, thus being an early example of the east–west synthesis which led to the development of a full-fledged Islamic art. While much of the decorated part of the facade has been removed, the rest of the structure can still be visited in situ, though little of what were probably once lavish decorative schemes remain.

History

There are a number of castles and palaces in Syria, Jordan, Israel, the Palestinian West Bank and Lebanon that date from the Umayyad dynasty, the so-called "Desert Castles". Qasr Al-Mshatta is one of the grander examples. They seem to have had a number of roles, probably including political and military control of the local area, and pleasure in the form of hunting.

In 1964 a brick was found at Mshatta with an inscription on it written by Sulaiman ibn Kaisan. Kaisan is known to have lived between 730 and 750 CE which lends further evidence to the theory that Caliph Al-Walid II commissioned the construction. His was the first of four short reigns of Caliphs between 743 and 750, after which the Abbasid dynasty came to power and moved the capital from Damascus, near the palace, to Bagdhad. If work had not already been abandoned, it no doubt was at that point.

Gallery

See also
 Desert castles
 History of medieval Arabic and Western European domes
 Islamic art
 Islamic architecture
 Jordanian art

References

External links

UNESCO World Heritage status of Qasr Mushatta
Archnet entry for Qasr Mushatta with pictures and architectural plans
Photos of Qasr al-Mshatta, The American Center of Research
Photos of Qasr al-Mshatta at the Manar al-Athar photo archive

Umayyad architecture in Jordan
Castles in Jordan
Umayyad palaces
Ruined palaces
Ruins in Jordan
Tourism in Jordan
Unfinished castles
8th-century establishments in the Umayyad Caliphate